Sky Television may refer to:

Sky Group, a pan-European broadcasting company (formerly British Sky Broadcasting (BSkyB))
Sky UK, a television and radio platform run by Sky Group
Sky Ireland, a satellite television service in Ireland run by Sky Group
Sky Deutschland, a satellite television service in Germany run by Sky Group
Sky Italia, an Italian digital satellite television service run by Sky Group
Sky Television (1984–1990), a four-channel network launched by Rupert Murdoch in 1984; merged with British Satellite Broadcasting to form BSkyB
Sky (New Zealand), a pay TV network in New Zealand
SKY Perfect JSAT Group
SKY PerfecTV!, in Japan
Sky México, in Mexico
SKY Brasil, in Brazil
Sky Turk 360, a Turkish television service
Sky (cable company), a Philippines television provider

See also
Skai TV, a Greek television network
Skynet (disambiguation), including some networks named Sky
Sky (disambiguation)